ETC is a Chilean cable television channel currently owned by Mega. The channel's slogan is "Todo pasa por Etc..." (Everything Happens on Etc...). Launched in 1996, the company was previously owned by Telefilms Ltda. Starting with a low budget, the channel was originally conceived as a "miscellaneous" channel (the name of the channel, ETC, is based on et cetera), focusing on  children's programming and some North American sitcoms in its first year. In 1997, when the channel aired Sailor Moon and Saint Seiya, it experienced an increase in its ratings, leading it to narrow its focus to include primarily Japanese anime, though, in recent years, it has also added some South Korean programming  including K-pop and K-dramas.

Anime aired on ETC
Some of the following Anime were aired on ETC TV, many of those series were also aired on some local Chilean channels, specially Chilevisión on their program "El Club de los Tigritos" (program later replaced by "Invasión") and some exceptions in TVN (Vision of Escaflowne and Lost Universe), Red Televisión (Detective Conan, also aired in Chilevisión) and Megavisión (Dragon Ball, Yu-Gi-Oh!).

Ashita no Nadja (beginning March 26, 2007)
Black Clover (beginning October 8, 2018)
Bikkuriman (first series only)
Black Jack (not completed)
Blood Blockade Battlefront (beginning June 28, 2021)
Bubblegum Crisis Tokyo 2040 (slightly edited North American version)
Captain Tsubasa (known in Latin America as "Los Super Campeones", aired the original series and Road to 2002)
Card Captor Sakura (original Japanese edition without any censorship of the US version, completed)
Creamy Mami, the Magic Angel (beginning June 1, 2020)
Corrector Yui (beginning March 24, 2008)
Crayon Shin-chan (translation of the English Vitello and Phuuz dubs)
Detective Conan (some seasons)
Digimon (original Japanese edition, until Digimon Frontier)
Doraemon (known in Latin America as "El Gato Cosmico")
Dr. Slump (1981 series: not completed, 1997 series: completed)
Dragon Ball (all seasons)
Fairy Tail (only the two season) (beginning November 7, 2022)
Ge Ge Ge no Kitaro (First 52 episodes of 90s series only)
Ghost Sweeper Mikami (completed)
 (known in Latin America as "Goleadores")
Gulliver Boy (completed)
Gundam Wing (the only Gundam series who was aired on Etc...TV, Chile and Latin America)
Hajime no Ippo (known in Latin America as "Espiritu de Lucha", first series only)
Hamtaro (beginning March 26, 2007)
Hell Teacher Nūbē (completed)
Hunter × Hunter (original Japanese edition, complete TV series plus Ryodan OVAs, now airing Greed Island)
Idaten Jump (completed)
Jibaku-kun (completed)
Kaleido Star (completed)
Kinnikuman (original Japanese edition, first 52 episodes only)
Koni chan (the dub were made in Mexico using a lot of slang, changing a lot the original concept)
Inuyasha (North American edition)

Magic Knight Rayearth (North American edit)
Sally The Witch (original Japanese edition, remake series)
Marmalade Boy (knows in Latin America as "La Familia Crece" but in the channel was announced by the original name, however and despite the name, the series were dubbed in Chile itself and get the same name as the Spanish edition)
Ninja Hattori
Ojamajo Doremi (original Japanese edition, only the first season)
One Piece (4Kids edit)
Patlabor
Prince of Tennis (still airing)
Pokémon (North American edit, eleven seasons)
Ranma ½ (completed)
Red Baron (completed)
Nintama Rantarou (know in Latin America as "Ninja Boy Rantaro")
Tantei Gakuen Q (know in Latin America as "Escuela de Detectives")
Sailor Moon (all seasons)
Sailor Moon Crystal
Saint Seiya (known in Latin America as "Los Caballeros del Zodiaco", original Japanese edition, all seasons Including Season Hades - Inferno: Now is conveying Season Hades - Elisios (starting on 02/08/2010))
Sakura Wars (known in Latin America as "La Guerra de Sakura", but in the channel is announced by the original name, the first TV season, 2020 series (starting on June 1, 2021))
Shaman King (completed)
Show by Rock!! (beginning March 1, 2021)
Slam Dunk (original Japanese edition, completed)
Slayers (known in Latin America as "Los Justicieros", all seasons)
Sonic X (North American edit) (beginning November 11, 2019)
Sorcerous Stabber Orphen (completed)
Tenchi Muyo (TV first season, "Tenchi in Tokyo" and OVA series)
The Irresponsible Captain Tylor (completed)
The Secret Garden (animated Japanese version of the book by Frances Hodgson Burnett)
The Vision of Escaflowne (original Japanese edition, completed)
Yaiba
You're Under Arrest (known in Latin America as "Estan Arrestados")
Yamazaki
Yu-Gi-Oh! (North American edit, completed)
Yu-Gi-Oh! GX (North American edit, still airing)
Zenki (completed)
Zoids (original Japanese edition, first season)
Bleach (anime) 
Death Note
Fullmetal Alchemist
Mighty Morphin Power Rangers
Nobody's Boy: Remi (under the title Remi)
Kamisama Kiss (under the title Soy una Diosa ¿Y ahora qué?)
Area no Kishi (under the title El Caballero del Área)
Bungo Stray Dogs
Yowamushi Pedal
Free!
Gamers!
The Saga of Tanya the Evil
Dagashi Kashi (beginning on October 18, 2021)

Korean drama aired on ETC
Korean drama (K-drama) aired on ETC. ETC is the only Chilean TV network that airs K-dramas.

Boys Over Flowers beginning April 16, 2012. dubbed as 'Casi el paraíso'. Reruns in 2013 and 2017.
Secret Garden beginning August 1, 2012. dubbed as 'Jardín secreto'. Rerun in 2013. 
Manny beginning October 1, 2012. Rerunned in 2013. 
Dream High in 2012–2013, dubbed as 'Dream High: Sueña sin límites'. Reruns in 2013 and September 25, 2017. 
Shining Inheritance beginning March 4, 2013. dubbed as 'Sorpresas del Destino'. 
Coffee Prince beginning on September 26, 2016. dubbed as 'El Príncipe del Café'.  
Goong beginning on November 14, 2016. dubbed as 'Educando a la princesa'. 
When a Man Falls in Love beginning on January 16, 2017. dubbed as 'Cuando un hombre ama'.
Mary Stayed Out All Night beginning May 15, 2017. Dubbed as 'Mary Está Fuera Por La Noche'.
Descendants of the Sun beginning June 26, 2017. Dubbed as 'Descendientes del sol'. Reruns on December 25, 2017 and July 30, 2018.
The Producers beginning August 7, 2017. Dubbed as 'Los productores'.
Two Mothers beginning August 7, 2017. Dubbed as 'Las dos madres'.
Big beginning March 5, 2018. Dubbed as 'Big: Creciendo sin querer'.
Love in the Moonlight beginning March 5, 2018. Dubbed with the same name. Rerun in 2019.
Healer beginning April 30, 2018. Dubbed as 'El sanador'.
The Innocent Man beginning June 25, 2018. Dubbed as 'El hombre inocente'.
The Princess' Man beginning August 20, 2018. Dubbed as 'El hombre de la princesa'.
You're Beautiful beginning October 8, 2018. Dubbed as 'Eres mi estrella'.
My Love from the Star beginning December 18, 2018. Dubbed as 'Mi amor de las estrellas'.
I Can Hear Your Voice beginning March 4, 2019. Dubbed as 'La voz de tu amor'.
Angel Eyes beginning March 4, 2019. Dubbed as 'Mirada de Ángel'.
What's Wrong with Secretary Kim? beginning May 27, 2019. Dubbed as '¿Qué le ocurre a la secretaria Kim?'.
The Royal Gambler beginning July 15, 2019. Dubbed as 'Apuesta final'.
100 Days My Prince beginning July 15, 2019. Dubbed as 'Mi Príncipe por 100 días'.
Encounter beginning September 9, 2019. Dubbed as 'Encuentro'.
Touch Your Heart beginning February 24, 2020. Dubbed as 'Un lugar en tu corazón'.
Search: WWW beginning February 24, 2020. Dubbed as 'Buscar: WWW'.
Another Miss Oh beginning July 20, 2020. Dubbed as 'La otra señorita Oh'
The Smile Has Left Your Eyes beginning July 20, 2020. Dubbed as 'La sonrisa se ha ido de tus ojos'.
Because This Is My First Life beginning November 2, 2020. Dubbed as 'Porque esta es mi primera vida'.
Hotel del Luna beginning November 2, 2020. Dubbed with the same name.
Guardian: The Lonely and Great God beginning March 1, 2021. Dubbed as 'Goblin'.
Emergency Couple beginning March 2, 2021. Dubbed with the same name.

See also
 List of Chilean television channels

External links
Official Site 

Mega (Chilean TV channel)
Anime television
Television networks in Chile
Television stations in Chile
Television channels and stations established in 1996
Spanish-language television stations
Companies based in Santiago
1996 establishments in Chile